Mel may be,

one of the Mel languages of West Africa
a dialect of the Mel-Khaonh language of Cambodia